Samtgemeinde Wesendorf is a Samtgemeinde in the district of Gifhorn, in Lower Saxony, Germany. It is situated approximately 10 km north of Gifhorn. 14.576 citizens are living in the Samtgemeinde Wesendorf.

Structure of the Samtgemeinde Wesendorf

References

Samtgemeinden in Lower Saxony
Gifhorn (district)